The Nagata–Smirnov metrization theorem in topology characterizes when a topological space is metrizable.  The theorem states that a topological space  is metrizable if and only if it is regular, Hausdorff and has a countably locally finite (that is, -locally finite) basis.

A collection in a space  is countably locally finite (or -locally finite) if it is the union of a countable family of locally finite collections of subsets of  

Unlike Urysohn's metrization theorem, which provides only a sufficient condition for metrizability, this theorem provides both a necessary and sufficient condition for a topological space to be metrizable. The theorem is named after Junichi Nagata and Yuriĭ Mikhaĭlovich Smirnov, whose (independent) proofs were published in 1950 and 1951, respectively.

See also

Notes

References 

 .
 .

General topology
Theorems in topology